Jakov Nenadović (1765 – 1836) was a Serbian voivode and politician who served as the prime minister of Serbia from 31 December 1810 to 22 January 1811. He was the first Serbian interior minister. Nenadović was the most influential figure in Serbia at the time beside Karađorđe and Janko Katić.

Life
Jakov was the younger brother of Aleksa Nenadović (1749–1804), a Serbian nobleman who held a province around Valjevo. He was grandnephew of Grigorije Nenadović, metropolitan of Raška and Valjevo. His brother was executed in the Slaughter of the Dukes on January 31, 1804, which sparked the First Serbian Uprising.

Jakov immediately joined the Serbian rebels, and after the victory in Svileuva (1804) he became one of the most distinguished commanders and persons of western Serbia. He acquired his ammunitions and weapons from Syrmia, then part of Austria. In March 1804, he attacked Šabac. Jakov was one of the founders of the Praviteljstvujušči sovjet serbski (Serbian government), of which Prota Mateja Nenadović, his nephew (the son of Aleksa), was the first Prime Minister. He headed the government of Serbia from 1810 to 1811.

In 1813, for the purpose of armory, a tower bearing the Nenadović name was built next to a road leading to Šabac, at the edge of Kličevac hill, by Jakov and his son Jevrem. After the failed uprising, Nenadović followed Karadjordje to Bessarabia in 1814, and in 1816 to Imperial Russia in St. Peterburg to confer with Tsar Alexander I of Russia over the state of affairs in the Balkans, then re-occupied by the Ottoman Turks. Later on, he settled in Vienna, where he died in 1836. His granddaughter, Persida Nenadović (the daughter of Jevrem), married Alexander Karađorđević, Prince of Serbia, the son of Karadjordje.

External links
Историјат обавештајно-безбедносних структура на територији Србије
Знамените личности Бранковине
Прва година Карађорђевог ратовања, одломци из књиге Константина Н. Ненадовића
др Љубивоје Церовић: Срби у Молдавији
Биографија Јакова Ненадовића

1765 births
1836 deaths
18th-century Serbian nobility
19th-century Serbian nobility
Jakov
Politicians from Valjevo
People of the First Serbian Uprising
Interior ministers of Serbia